The Congressional Solar Caucus is a bipartisan United States House of Representatives caucus whose members "work on a bipartisan basis to find common ground to tackle issues facing solar business and communities" The caucus was started in February 2018, during the 115th Congress, by Representatives Raja Krishnamoorthi (D-IL) and Ralph Norman (R-SC).

Mission 
The mission of the Caucus is: "to raise awareness for how policymakers, business leaders, and academic experts can work together to foster jobs, growth, and America’s leadership in the solar industry."

Members, 116th Congress 

In the 116th Congress, members are as follows:  

Last updated February 5, 2019

See also
Photovoltaics
Solar power in the United States
Caucuses of the United States Congress
United States House of Representatives

References

Photovoltaics
Panel
Caucuses of the United States Congress